The canton of Bréhal is an administrative division of the Manche department, northwestern France. Its borders were modified at the French canton reorganisation which came into effect in March 2015. Its seat is in Bréhal.

It consists of the following communes:

Anctoville-sur-Boscq
Beauchamps
Bréhal
Bréville-sur-Mer
Bricqueville-sur-Mer
Cérences
Chanteloup
Coudeville-sur-Mer
Équilly
Folligny
Le Grippon
La Haye-Pesnel
Hocquigny
Hudimesnil
Longueville
Le Loreur
La Lucerne-d'Outremer
Le Luot
Le Mesnil-Aubert
La Meurdraquière
La Mouche
Muneville-sur-Mer
Saint-Aubin-des-Préaux
Saint-Jean-des-Champs
Saint-Planchers
Saint-Sauveur-la-Pommeraye
Subligny

References

Cantons of Manche